This article contains information about the literary events and publications of 1598.

Events
Before September – A second edition of Love's Labour's Lost appears in London as the first known printing of a Shakespeare play to have his name on the title page ("Newly corrected and augmented by W. Shakespere").
February 23 – Thomas Bodley refounds the Bodleian Library at the University of Oxford.
March 28 – Philip Henslowe contracts Edward Alleyn and Thomas Heywood to act for the Admiral's Men in London for two years.
April 30 – A comedy, by anonymous playwriter about an expedition of soldiers, is very first theatrical performance in North America staged near El Paso for Spanish colonists.  
May 3 – The Spanish playwright Lope de Vega marries for the second time, to Juana de Guardo.
c. May – The premiėre of William Haughton's Englishmen for My Money, or, A Woman Will Have Her Will introduces what is seen as the first city comedy, probably by the Admiral's Men at London's Rose Theatre.
c. July/September – Ben Jonson's comedy of humours Every Man in His Humour is probably first performed, by the Lord Chamberlain's Men at the Curtain Theatre, London, perhaps with Shakespeare playing Kno'well.
September 7 – Francis Meres' Palladis Tamia, Wits Treasury is registered for publication, including the first list and critical discussion of Shakespeare's works; he also mentions that Shakespeare's "sugar'd sonnets" are circulating privately.
September 22 – Ben Jonson kills actor Gabriel Spenser in a duel in London and is briefly held in Newgate Prison, but escapes capital punishment by pleading benefit of clergy.
October – Edmund Spenser's  castle at Kilcolman, County Cork, near Doneraile in Ireland, is burned down by native forces under Hugh O'Neill, Earl of Tyrone. Spenser leaves for London shortly after.
November 25 – Henry Chettle is paid for "mending" a play about Robin Hood to make it suitable for performance at court.
December 28 – London's The Theatre is dismantled.
unknown dates
Lancelot Andrewes turns down the bishoprics of Ely and Salisbury.
The English poet Barnabe Barnes is prosecuted in the Star Chamber for attempted murder of one John Browne, first by offering him a poisoned lemon and then by sweetening his wine with sugar laced with mercury sublimate; Browne survives both attempts.
John Marston's The Metamorphosis of Pigmalion's Image and Certaine Satyres begins a trend in English satirical writing that leads to official suppression in the following year.

New books

Prose
John Bodenham – Politeuphuia (Wits' Commonwealth)
John Florio – A World of Words, Italian/English dictionary, the first dictionary published in England to use quotations ("illustrations") for meaning to the words
Emanuel Ford – Parismus, the Renowned Prince of Bohemia (first part)
King James VI of Scotland – The Trew Law of Free Monarchies
Francis Meres – Palladis Tamia
Merkelis Petkevičius – 
John Stow – Survey of London
Zhao Shizhen – Shenqipu (3rd century, possible first publication)
Lucas Janszoon Waghenaer – Enchuyser zeecaertboeck (Enkhuizen book of sea charts)

Drama
Anonymous
The Famous Victories of Henry V earliest known publication
Mucedorus published
The Pilgrimage to Parnassus (earliest possible date of composition)
Jakob Ayrer
Von der Erbauung Roms (The Building of Rome)
Von der schönen Melusina (Fair Melusina)
Samuel Brandon – Virtuous Octavia
Henry Chettle, Henry Porter and Ben Jonson – Hot Anger Soon Cold
Robert Greene – The Scottish History of James IV published
William Haughton – Englishmen for My Money
Ben Jonson – Every Man in His Humour
Anthony Munday – The Downfall of Robert Earl of Huntingdon
Anthony Munday (and Henry Chettle?) – The Death of Robert Earl of Huntingdon
Henry Porter – Love Prevented
William Shakespeare
Henry IV, Part 1 (published)
Love's Labour's Lost (published)

Poetry
Richard Barnfield
The Encomium of Lady Pecunia
Poems in Divers Humours
George Chapman – translation of Homer's Iliad into English
Lope de Vega – La Arcadia and La Dragontea
Christopher Marlowe – Hero and Leander (completed by Chapman following Marlowe's death)
John Marston – The Metamorphosis of Pigmalian's Image and The Scourge of Villanie

Births
March 12 – Guillaume Colletet, French writer (died 1659)
March 13 – Johannes Loccenius, German historian (died 1677)
July 29 – Henricus Regius, Dutch philosopher and correspondent of René Descartes (died 1679)
August 7 – Georg Stiernhielm, Swedish poet (died 1672)
unknown date – Johann George Moeresius, German poet (died 1657)

Deaths
January 2 - Morris Kyffin, Welsh soldier and author (born c.1555)
January 9 – Jasper Heywood, English translator (born 1535)
February 27 – Friedrich Dedekind, German theologian (born 1524)
April 10 – Jacopo Mazzoni, Italian philosopher (born 1548)
August – Alexander Montgomerie, outlawed Scottish poet (born c. 1545/1550)
December 6 – Paolo Paruta, Venetian historian (born 1540)
December 15 – Philips van Marnix, lord of Sint-Aldegonde, Dutch statesman and author (born 1540)
December 31 – Heinrich Rantzau, German humanist writer (born 1526)
unknown date – David Powel, Welsh historian who popularised continuing legends such as that of Prince Madoc (born c. 1549)

References

 
Years of the 16th century in literature